The 5th New York Infantry Regiment, also known as Duryée's Zouaves, was a volunteer infantry regiment of the Union Army during the American Civil War, led by Colonel Abram Duryée.  Modeled, like other  Union and Confederate infantry regiments, on the French Zouaves of Crimean War fame, its tactics and uniforms were different from those of the standard infantry.

Even the uniforms of the 5th New York's were modeled closely on those of French Zouaves: a dark blue Zouave jacket with red trim, a dark blue shirt with red trim, a red Zouave sash with sky blue trim, extremely baggy red pantaloons, a red fez with a yellow tassel, white gaiters and leather jambières ("leggings").  The 165th New York Volunteer Infantry was regarded as a sister regiment and known as the "Second Battalion, Duryee Zouaves". The 165th wore the same uniform as the 5th with the exception of the tassel of the fez, which was dark blue instead of yellow-gold.  Photographic evidence suggests that later in the war the 165th was given replacement sashes that were a solid red color without the light blue trim.

Formation

The regiment was formed on April 12, 1861, by a group of military enthusiasts in Manhattan and deployed from Fort Schuyler at Throgs Neck, New York Harbor.  Colonel Abram Duryée was appointed as the commander of the regiment.  The majority of the soldiers were educated and above average height.  On May 24, the regiment boarded a transport to reach the Virginia Peninsula.  Immediately at Fort Monroe, the regiment began making scouting expeditions.

By the end of May, the regiment moved to Baltimore, Maryland, where they built and garrisoned an earthen fort at the summit of Federal Hill.  Duryée was promoted to general rank, so Gouverneur Kemble Warren took over command of the regiment.  There, the regiment continuously drilled, until General George McClellan ordered the regiment to join the Army of the Potomac in the campaign to capture Richmond, Virginia.  McClellan said that, upon seeing the colorful New York regiment, "the Fifth is the best disciplined and soldierly regiment in the Army."

Fighting

At the Battle of Hanover Courthouse on May 27, 1862, the regiment played only a minor role.  However, they fought in a more major role in the Battle of Gaines' Mill of the Seven Days Battles. 
As McClellan moved his base to the James River on June 27, 1862, the regiment fought against Gregg’s South Carolina brigade.  In a counterattack, the regiment defeated the initial Rebel attack.

In August 1862, the regiment fell under the control of General John Pope.  At the Second Battle of Bull Run (also known as the Second Battle of Manassas), the 5th New York Volunteer Infantry regiment was forced to withstand the advancing forces of General James Longstreet.  In underestimating the size of the Confederate army, Pope ordered the regiment to support Hazlett’s Battery. Longstreet’s soldiers easily outnumbered the small regiment, met by the 5th Texas Vol. Of the famous Texas Brigade's who elite soldiers accurate musket volleys quickly inflicted massive casualties in the regiment. In just 10 minutes of fighting, the 5th New York lost 332 men of the approximately 525 engaged. At least 119 of the casualties were killed outright or died of their wounds. The addition of two missing who were never accounted for would bring the death total to 121. It was the greatest battle fatality sustained by any Federal infantry unit in the war. The entire Color Guard was killed, except for one man. The only officer to survive the battle was Captain Cleveland Winslow. The regiment was effectively removed as a combat regiment, never again serving in the battle line. 

Later, at the Battle of Antietam, September 17, the unit was held in reserve.  On December 15, the unit fought at the Battle of Fredericksburg, covering the Union retreat.  At the Battle of Chancellorsville under Joseph Hooker, the unit saw its final combat.

In the fall of 1862, officers of the 5th detailed on recruiting duty had organized the 165th New York Volunteer Infantry, or "Second Battalion Duryee's Zouaves." The 165th served with the 19th Corps in Louisiana, in Virginia's Shenandoah Valley, and on occupation duty in Charleston, South Carolina, at war's end.

Colonel Cleveland Winslow of the 5th organized the 5th New York Veteran Volunteer Infantry after the original 5th mustered out. After a long and difficult recruiting period, the 5th Veterans joined the V Corps and fought in the final campaigns of the Virginia front.

Legacy

Following the conclusion of the war, members of the 5th New York Veterans Association continued to hold monthly meetings. The veterans' association funded the creation of a statue to General Warren, their first commander, on Little Round Top at Gettysburg.  They also erected a monument to the regiment at the scene of their greatest sacrifice on the battlefield of Second Bull Run (Manassas).  The association also contributed to a monument to the Army of the Potomac's 5th Corps in Fredericksburg National Cemetery in Virginia.

See also
List of New York Civil War regiments

References

External links
New York State Military Museum and Veterans Research Center - 5th Infantry Regiment - Civil War History, table of battles and casualties, Civil War newspaper clippings, historical sketch, national flag and regimental flag for the 5th New York Infantry Regiment.
 
 5th NY - Duryee's Zouaves Retrieved April 23, 2006, from Civil War Zouave Database.

Infantry 005
1861 establishments in New York (state)
Military units and formations established in 1861
Military units and formations disestablished in 1863